Eastlake Landfill is a Class III landfill located in Clearlake, California.

Description
Eastlake Landfill is a canyon fill which has been operating since 1972. It covers 32 acres, and is owned and operated by the Lake County Public Services department. As demand on the facility surged following fire cleanup and general population growth through the mid-2010s, a plan was approved to expand the landfill in 2014. The expansion is expected to be complete by 2024.

References

Landfills in California
Clearlake, California
Geography of Lake County, California